Phyllidiopsis blanca is a species of sea slug, a dorid nudibranch, a shell-less marine gastropod mollusk in the family Phyllidiidae.

Distribution 
This species was described from San Nicolas Island, San Francisco, United States with additional specimens from Isla San Benitos, Baja California, Mexico. It is a rare species which has also been recorded from Palos Verdes and San Pedro.

Description
This nudibranch has a white dorsum with simple tubercles. It is a medium-sized Phyllidiid, growing to at least 25 mm in length.

Diet
This species feeds on the sponge Hymenamphiastra cyanocrypta.

References

Phyllidiidae
Gastropods described in 1988